Sean Jarrett (born April 26, 1984) is a professional baseball player who plays as a pitcher for the Brisbane Bandits in the Australian Baseball League and in the Colorado Rockies organisation.

Jarrett was drafted by the Colorado Rockies in the 20th round of the 2006 MLB June Amateur Draft. He played the entire 2011 season with the Rockies AA affiliate, the Tulsa Drillers.

External links
 Bandits profile
Baseball Reference - minors

1983 births
Living people
Brisbane Bandits players
Tri-City Dust Devils players
Asheville Tourists players
Modesto Nuts players
Tulsa Drillers players
Camden Riversharks players
American expatriate baseball players in Australia